Cheang Chon Man (born June 22, 1971) is a Macau professional football player and manager. He plays as a striker for clubs G.D. Negro Rubro, PSP Macau, G.D. Lam Pak and Hong Ngai. Since 2012 he is a coach of the PSP Macau.

Honours
Macau Championship: 2
 2005, 2006

References

External links

1971 births
Living people
Macau footballers
Macau international footballers
G.D. Lam Pak players
Macau football managers
Association football forwards
Place of birth missing (living people)